Carter is an unincorporated community in eastern Knox County, Tennessee. It is included in the Knoxville Metropolitan Statistical Area.

History
Carter has been known throughout history as a 'tight-knit' rural community known for its residents' anti-development approach, and preservation of agricultural culture. Since the proposal of the Midway Business Park in nearby Thorn Grove, efforts to ease the controversy of development in the Carter area have increased through public forums.

Geography
Carter is located 14 miles east of the city of Knoxville. It is also located partially inside Knoxville's city limits and urban growth boundary. It is represented by Knoxville ZIP code 37924, and Strawberry Plains ZIP code 37871.

Economy
Carter has a Food City supermarket, a pharmacy and several dollar stores.

Plans for a mixed-use town centre in Carter been proposed since 2001 by the Knoxville-Knox County Metropolitan Planning Commission to provide a community hub space for eastern Knox County as the Carter area's population grows.

Education

Public schools
Students in the Carter area attend the following schools in the Knox County Schools district:
Carter Elementary School
Carter Middle School
Carter High School
Career Magnet Academy

Infrastructure
The Knoxville Utilities Board (KUB) provides water, sewer, gas, and electricity to the Carter area. However, sewer service by the KUB is limited to the denser and more developed portions of the community, with those outside of these areas having to use individual septic tank and drain field systems.

Transportation
All U.S. routes, state routes in Carter, along with I-40, are maintained by the Tennessee Department of Transportation (TDOT) in TDOT Region 1, which consists of 24 counties in East Tennessee. Streets, sidewalks, and greenways in the Carter area are maintained by the Knox County Engineering & Public Works Department, or the City of Knoxville Engineering Department for portions inside the Knoxville city limits.

Principal highways
 
  (Andrew Johnson Highway, Asheville Highway)
 
 
  (concurrent to US 70-US 25W) 
  (concurrent to US 11E)

Major surface routes

 Brakebill Road
 Carter School Road
 Ruggles Ferry Pike
 Pleasant Hill Road
 Strawberry Plains Pike

References

Unincorporated communities in Knox County, Tennessee
Unincorporated communities in Tennessee